The May Bumps 2002 were a set of rowing races held at Cambridge University from Wednesday 12 June 2002 to Saturday 15 June 2002. The event was run as a bumps race and was the 111th set of races in the series of May Bumps that have been held annually in mid-June in this form since 1887. In 2002, a total of 172 crews took part (103 men's crews and 69 women's crews), with around 1500 participants in total.

Head of the River crews 
 Caius men bumped Emmanuel and Downing to take back the headship they lost in 2001, achieving the headship for the 4th time since 1998.

 Caius women rowed-over in 1st position, achieving the headship for the 3rd consecutive year (being head for 11 consecutive days - the 2nd longest ever defence of the women's Mays headship)

Highest 2nd VIIIs 
 The highest men's 2nd VIII for the 3rd consecutive year was Downing II.

 The highest women's 2nd VIII for the 2nd consecutive year was Jesus II.

Links to races in other years

Bumps charts 
Below are the bumps charts for the men's and women's 1st divisions. The men's bumps charts are on the left, and women's bumps charts on the right. The bumps chart represents the progress of every crew over all four days of the racing. To follow the progress of any particular crew, simply find the crew's name on the left side of the chart and follow the line to the end-of-the-week finishing position on the right of the chart.

May Bumps results
May Bumps
May Bumps
May Bumps